Jacob Frey (born 1981) is an American politician.

Jacob Frey may also refer to:

 Jacob Fry Jr. (1802–1866), American politician
 Jakob Frey (1824–1875), Swiss writer
 Johann Jakob Frey the Elder (1681–1752), Swiss engraver
 Jacob Frye, video game character